Steve Hutchinson may refer to:

Steve Hutchinson (American football) (born 1977), National Football League offensive lineman
Steve Hutchinson (figure skater) (born 1949), Canadian figure skater